Erland is a Nordic given name with several possible origins. The name is earliest attested in a Norwegian runestone as arlantr. Notable people with the name include:

Erland Almqvist (1912–1999), Swedish sailor who competed in the 1952 Summer Olympics
Leif Erland Andersson (1944–1979), Swedish astronomer
Erland Asdahl (1921–1988), Norwegian politician for the Centre Party
Erland Carlsson (1822–1893), Swedish-American Lutheran Minister
Gawain Erland Cooper, Orcadian and Scottish folk guitarist and singer
Erland Dryselius (Benedikt, Brodderi) Dryselius (1641–1708), Swedish priest, historian and translator
Erland Erlandson (c. 1790 – 1875), Dano-Canadian explorer and fur trader
Bengt Erland Fogelberg (also Benedict Fogelberg), (1786–1854), Swedish sculptor
Erland Harold Hedrick or E. H. Hedrick (1894–1954), American Democratic politician from West Virginia
Erland Hellström (born 1980), Swedish football goalkeeper
Erland Herkenrath (1912–2003), Swiss field handball player who competed in the 1936 Summer Olympics
Erland Johnsen (born 1967), retired Norwegian footballer and current manager
Erland Josephson (1923–2012), Swedish actor and author
Erland Kiøsterud (born 1953), Norwegian novelist
Erland Koch (1867–1945), German sports shooter who competed in the 1912 Summer Olympics
Erland Koch (1913–1972) Swedish sports shooter
Erland Kops (1937–2017), former badminton player from Denmark
Erland Lee (1864–1926), Canadian farmer, teacher, government employee, founder of the Women's Institutes
Erland Lindén (1880–1952), Swedish sailor who competed in the 1912 Summer Olympics
Erland Nordenskiöld (1877–1932), Finnish-Swedish archeologist and anthropologist
Erland Pison (born 1974), Belgian politician
Erland Samuel Bring (1736–1798), Swedish mathematician
Erland Steenberg (1919–2009), Norwegian politician for the Centre Party
Erland Van Lidth De Jeude (1953–1987), Dutch-born actor, wrestler, opera singer and worked with computers
Erland von Koch (1910–2009), Swedish composer
Erling Erland (1917–1988), Norwegian politician and Member of Parliament for Anders Lange's Party
Olof Erland (1944–2013), politician in the autonomous Åland Islands
Rune Erland (born 1968), Norwegian handball player

See also
Erland and the Carnival, British folk rock band
Erland Falls,  waterfall in Stoney Creek, Hamilton, Ontario, Canada
Erland Lee Museum, National Historic Site of Canada located on the ridge of the Niagara Escarpment in Stoney Creek, Ontario
Arland (disambiguation), Aurland, Årland
Erlandson, Erlandsson, Erlang, Euroland
Herland, Hærland
Orland, Ørland

References

Masculine given names
Swedish masculine given names
Norwegian masculine given names
Scandinavian masculine given names